Gyambo Tshering is a Bhutanese politician who has been a member of the National Assembly of Bhutan, since October 2018.

Education
He holds a Master's degree in Horticulture.

Political career
He ran for the seat of the National Assembly of Bhutan as a candidate of DPT from Bardo-Trong constituency in the 2013 Bhutanese National Assembly election, but was unsuccessful. He received 2, 255 votes and lost the seat to Lekey Dorji, a candidate of the People's Democratic Party (PDP).

He was elected to the National Assembly of Bhutan as a candidate of DPT from Bardo-Trong constituency in 2018 Bhutanese National Assembly election. He received 3,633 votes and defeated Sonam Leki, a candidate of DNT.

References

1966 births
Living people
Bhutanese MNAs 2018–2023
Druk Phuensum Tshogpa politicians
Druk Phuensum Tshogpa MNAs